Hossein Behzad  (1894 – 13 October 1968) (حسین بهزاد) was a prominent Iranian painter. His early work was in the styles of the old masters of Persian painting of the sixteenth and seventeenth centuries, hoping to save Persian miniature painting from oblivion.

Biography 
Born in Shiraz, Iran in 1894 to Mirza Lotfollah Esfahani. His father was a pen-holder designer.

He married Azizeh Khanam in 1921, who gave birth to their only child, Parviz.

During the early 1930s, Behzad reorganized Tehran's Madrasa-I Sanayi-I Mustazrafa. In 1934 he left Tehran for Paris and stayed for thirteen months. During this time which time he studied various Eastern and Western painting styles at the Louvre, Guimet museum and Palace of Versailles. It was during this trip developed a completely new style of miniature painting, combining aspects of traditional Persian painting with contemporary painting from the West.

He became internationally known and won many awards including the 'first class medal of the ministry of culture' from Iran in 1949 and the 'first class medal of international painting' from Minneapolis, USA in 1958. In 1968 Behzad was give an honorary professorship by the College of Ornamental Arts, Behzad's works have been displayed across the world. To celebrate the millennium of Avicenna, in 1953 he held an exhibition at the Iran Bastan Museum. This caused a sensation and was seen by many international visitors. The paintings on show, which took ten years to complete, included the like of Ferdowsi and the Maedan Arch. The exhibition became particularly important to scholars of oriental studies. In an article for the Vatan newspaper of Istanbul, Professor Soheil Anwar wrote, " Behzad, this great artist does not belong only to Iran. He now belongs to the world."

Shortly after, and to much critical acclaim, Behzad held an exhibition, which was sponsored by the French government, at the Museum of Modern Art in Paris. The exhibition was opened by the French minister for culture on 18 May 1955.

He first practiced a conservative form of Neo-Safavidism, and later developed a new idiom that merged revivalism and modernism. In 1956, fifty Behzad miniatures were put on display in the Library of Congress, Washington DC. As Behzad became a living master, he held exhibitions across the world including London, Prague, New York, Boston and Brussels, as well as in India and Japan.

Death and legacy 
By 1968 Behzad had become ill and was sent twice to Europe by the Ministry of Culture. Despite this, Behzad died at 8:48pm on 13 October 1968 at the age of 74. He was buried at the cemetery near Imamzadeh Abdollah in Shahr-i Ray.

In honor of the artist, the Behzad Museum was founded in 1994, and is located in Tehran's Sa'dabad Complex and holds a large collection of his works.

Awards 
 1968 – Honorary title of Art Master by the Council of the Art Instructors of the College of Decorative Arts, Tehran
 1953 – Avicenna Medal from Iran-Bastan Museum
 1952 – Olympic diploma for the best painting at the Olympic Painting Exhibition in Helsinki, Finland

See also
 Baghdad School
 Islamic art
 Iranian art
 Islamic calligraphy
 List of Iranian artists

References 

 Omar Khayyam: Vierzeiler (Rubāʿīyāt) übersetzt von Friedrich Rosen mit Miniaturen von Hossein Behzad.   Details

External links 

His Biography

1894 births
1968 deaths
Persian miniature painters
20th-century Iranian painters
People from Shiraz